Oliveto Lucano is a town and comune in the province of Matera, in the Southern Italian region of Basilicata. Its mayor is Nicola Terranova. This town is most known for the "Maggio Festival", which is dedicated to St. Cyprian and takes place on the 10th, 11th and 12th of August.

References

Cities and towns in Basilicata